The political history of Mysore and Coorg (1800–1947) is the political history of the contiguous historical regions of Mysore state and Coorg province located on the Deccan Plateau in west-central peninsular India, beginning with the acceptance of British suzerainty in 1800 to the independence of India in 1947.

Purnea's administration
In the amāni lands (i.e. government-managed lands) the tax on cultivation in dry regions was a fixed money amount paid annually at approximately one-third of the crop value; for a given area, the crop value, was estimated and fixed for several years at a time.  In "wet" or rice-growing regions, however, which on average provided more abundant yields, but which also depended more on the vagaries of the monsoon rains, the crop value was estimated annually, as soon as an estimate could be made.  The latter tax was computed at one-half of the crop value and was paid "nominally in kind," but commonly in money.

Sources and historiography
There is very little contemporaneous documentation of the pre-1760 period of Mysore's history, especially the last century of that period.

A Wodeyar dynasty genealogy, the Maisüru Mahardjara Vamsävali of Tirumalarya, was composed in Kannada during the period 1710–1715, and was claimed to be based on all the then-extant inscriptions in the region.  Another genealogy, Kalale Doregala Vamgdvati, of the Delvoys, the near-hereditary chief ministers of Mysore, was composed around the turn of the 19th century.  However, neither manuscript provides information about administration, economy or military capability.  The ruling dynasty's origins, especially as expounded in later palace genealogies, are also of doubtful accuracy; this is, in part, because the Wodeyars, who were reinstated by the British on the Mysore gaddi in 1799, to preside over a fragile sovereignty, "obsessively" attempted to demonstrate their "unbroken" royal lineage, to bolster their then uncertain status.

The earliest manuscript offering clues to governance and military conflict in the pre-1760 Mysore, seems to be , an annual letter written in Portuguese by a Mysore-based Jesuit missionary, Joachim Dias, and addressed to his Provincial superior. Around this time, French accounts of the Anglo-Mysore wars appeared as well, and included , a history of the wars by Joseph-François Michaud, another Jesuit priest.

Wilks claimed to have based his history on various Kannada documents, not only the ones mentioned above, but also many that have not survived. By the end of the period of British Commissionership of Mysore (1831–1881), many English language works had begun to appear on a variety of Mysore-related subjects.

See also
Princely state
Political history of Mysore and Coorg (1565–1760)
Political history of Mysore and Coorg (1761–1799)

Notes

References

Contemporary sources

Classic sources

Political history of Karnataka
History of Mysore
Coorg